Salmonid herpesvirus 2 (SalHV-2) is a species of virus in the genus Salmonivirus, family Alloherpesviridae, and order Herpesvirales.

References 

Alloherpesviridae